Harkishan Singh (25 November 1928 – 20 March 2020) was Professor Emeritus at the Panjab University (Chandigarh, India). He was a well recognized pharmaceutical academic, medicinal chemistry researcher and science historian. He had more than half a century experience in his respective fields to his credit. He worked at the Banaras Hindu University, University of Saugar, and the Panjab University in India, and abroad at the University of Maryland, University of Mississippi and the University of London.

His scientific research had been in organic chemistry, medicinal chemistry and natural products. Nearly 50 master and doctoral theses were completed under his supervision. There were published 125 original scientific research papers. 14 patents were obtained. His research group was successful in designing a clinically useful skeletal muscle relaxant, candocuronium iodide (INN) (chandonium iodide, HS-310), which is a synthetic azasteroid. Dr Singh lectured on his research at several of the institutions and conferences in India, United States of America, Canada, United Kingdom and China. He had delivered invited lectures at the Harvard School of Medicine and at the International Symposium on Molecular Structure sponsored by the International Union of Crystallography at Beijing.

As a science historian Professor Singh examined the history of pharmaceutical developments in India of the nineteenth and twentieth centuries. His history research studies were on pharmacopoeias and formularies, pharmaceutical education, pharmacy practice, biographies of pharmaceutical luminaries, and pharmaceutical journalism. He published over fifty articles.

In addition to his scientific and history research papers, Dr Singh authored and/or co-authored twelve books and nearly two dozen review articles, including several book chapters. He wrote extensively on educational, scientific, historical and professional issues. All told, his publications came to well over 300.

Professor Singh was on many academic, scientific, professional and governmental bodies. He was a member of the Committee on Education in Medicinal Chemistry of the International Union of Pure and Applied Chemistry (IUPAC), which prepared the Report on the International Education of Medicinal Chemists (IUPAC Technical Reports Number 13; 1974).

His affiliations with several scientific and professional organizations included emeritus membership of the American Chemical Society, life memberships of the Indian Pharmaceutical Association and Association of Pharmaceutical Teachers of India, and memberships of the American Institute of History of Pharmacy and British Society for History of Pharmacy.

Professor Harkishan Singh was the recipient of several scientific and professional awards and recognitions. He was a National Fellow of the University Grants Commission, New Delhi. He was General President of the Indian Pharmaceutical Congress. He received Eminent Pharmacist Award of the Indian Pharmaceutical Association. Dr Singh's standing as historian was recognized through his election to the Académie Internationale d'Histoire de la Pharmacie. The University of the Sciences in Philadelphia conferred upon Professor Harkishan Singh the degree of Doctor of Science (Honoris Causa) in recognition of his distinguished academic career and outstanding contributions to scientific research in organic and medicinal chemistry and the history of pharmacy.



Neuromuscular Blocker Candocuronium (Chandonium)
A new neuromuscular blocker, initially named as Chandonium Iodide, was designed and synthesized by the research group of Professor Harkishan Singh at the Panjab University, Chandigarh. The pharmacological testing was carried out at the University at Strathclyde. The toxicity studies at the Central Drug Research Institute, Lucknow, did not reveal any adverse effects. The clinical studies were also successfully completed through the CDRI. The proceedings of the symposium on the clinical testing on Chandonium Iodide were published in the Journal of Anesthesiology and Clinical Pharmacology, 10, 109–151 (1994). The drug was cleared by the Ministry of Health, Government of India, for manufacturing and clinical use. The World Health Organization gave to the drug the INN designation Candocuronium Iodide. The drug is a potent non-depolarizing neuromuscular blocker with short duration of action. The injections can be sterilized by autoclaving. The preparation can be stored at room temperature without any loss of activity.

Career
 Lecturer in Pharmaceutical Chemistry, Banaras Hindu University, 1953–56
 Assistant Professor of Pharmaceutical Chemistry, University of Saugar, 1956–64
 Postdoctoral Research Fellow in Pharmaceutical Chemistry,   University of Maryland, U.S.A., 1958–61 (on leave of absence from the University of Saugar)
 Reader in Pharmaceutical Chemistry, Panjab University, 1964–72
 Visiting Professor and Research Fellow in Pharmaceutical Chemistry, University of Mississippi, U.S.A.1967–68 (on leave of absence from the Panjab University)
 Commonwealth Academic Staff Fellow, University of London, U.K., 1971–72 (on leave of absence from the Panjab University)
 Professor, Pharmaceutical Sciences (Pharmaceutical Chemistry), Panjab University, 1972–88
 Head, Department of Pharmaceutical Sciences, Panjab University, 1976–81
 Dean, Alumni Relations, Panjab University, 1979–84
 Dean, Faculty of Pharmaceutical Sciences, Panjab University, 1981–85
 Emeritus Fellow (University Grants Commission), Panjab University, 1989–92
 Professor Emeritus, Panjab University, since 2003

Awards and honors
 1975 Annual Award of the Shri Amrut Mody Research Foundation
 President, Indian Pharmaceutical Congress, Thirty-third Session (1981), Jaipur
 1983 G. P. Srivastava Memorial Award, Association of Pharmaceutical Teachers of India, Nagpur
 1984 Professor M. L. Khorana Lectureship, Indian Pharmaceutical Association, Bombay
 National Fellow, University Grants Commission, 1985–87; the only pharmaceutical academic to get this honour
 1987 Ranbaxy Research Award in Pharmaceutical Sciences, Ranbaxy Research Foundation, New Delhi
 Elected Member, Academie Internationale d'Historie de la Pharmacie, 1995
 1998 Schroff Memorial National Award, Indian Hospital Pharmacists' Association, New Delhi
 1999 Eminent Pharmacist Award, Indian Pharmaceutical Association, Bombay
 Lifetime Achievement Award, Uttar Pradesh Technical University, 2006
 Lifetime Achievement Award, Chandigarh Science Congress, 2007
 Shri Bhojraj Panjamool Lifetime Achievement Award, Association of Pharmaceutical Teachers of India, Bangalore, 2007
 Lifetime Achievement Award, 59th Indian Pharmaceutical Congress, Banaras Hindu University, 2007
 Shri Ramanbhai B. Patel Foundation Lifetime Achievement Award, Indian Pharmaceutical Association, Mumbai, 2010
 Invited Lecture Delivered at Workshop on "Science in India in the 20th Century," Asiatic Society, Kolkata, 2011
 Doctor of Science (Honoris Causa) conferred by the University of the Sciences in Philadelphia, Philadelphia, Pennsylvania, U.S.A., 2014
 Lifetime Achievement Award, Punjab Academy of Sciences, Patiala, 2015
 Doctor of Science (Honoris Causa) conferred by the Panjab University, Chandigarh, India., 2016
 Padma Shri in Medicine in Jan 2017 by Govt. Of India for his notable work.

References

External links 
 Profharkishansingh.com

1928 births
2020 deaths
20th-century Indian chemists
Panjab University alumni
University System of Maryland people
University of Mississippi faculty
Academic staff of Panjab University
Banaras Hindu University people
University of the Sciences alumni
Recipients of the Padma Shri in medicine
Scientists from Chandigarh